Treaty of Brno may refer to:

Treaty of Brno (1478)
Treaty of Brno (1920)